Kaave River is a river in Jõgeva County, Estonia. The river is 41.8 km long and basin size is 135.4 km2. It runs into Pedja River.

References

Rivers of Estonia
Jõgeva County